Mionochroma rufitarse is a species of beetle in the family Cerambycidae. It was described by Schwarzer in 1929. It is known from Bolivia.

References

Cerambycinae
Beetles described in 1929